The 2013 Summer Universiade, officially known as the XXVII Summer Universiade, was held in the city of Kazan, Russia, the most northerly city ever to host a Summer Universiade. Over 10,400 university athletes from 162 countries participated in 13 mandatory and 14 optional sports, making the 2013 Universiade the biggest ever in the history of the event. For the first time in history a Cultural Universiade was also included, with many festivals and shows held simultaneously with the sporting events. The Universiade was organized by the International University Sports Federation (FISU) and by the authorities of the Russian Federation.

Bidding process
Kazan had bid twice for the Universiade; the first attempt was for the 2011 Summer Universiade, but Kazan lost to Shenzhen by just two votes. The city applied again for the 2013 Summer Universiade, and won the right to host the Universiade.

The games

Transportation
Prior to the Universiade, Kazan International Airport was totally rebuilt as a hub, the new Kazan-2 transit rail-bus terminal was built, the old Kazan-1 rail terminal was rebuilt, and the fast rail aeroexpress with Siemens trains was inaugurated between the Kazan-1 rail terminal downtown and the airport.

Zones of activity of the Universiade were connected by renewed highways with two-level flyovers, including the completed "Big Kazan Ring" with a new LRT (fast tram). In addition, a Kremlin bridge over the Kazanka River was rebuilt. The key transportation connector to the sporting and other venues from the Universiade Village was the Kazan Metro (subway) that had been built in 2005 and was expanded before the Universiade.

A large part of design works was carried out by JSC Institute Tatdorproject (autoroads, pedestrian crosses, transport junctions), Roszheldorproject (arrangement of intermodal transportation),  Energoprojekt (reconstruction of Kazan International Airport), etc.

The Cultural Universiade was held in the Cultural Park at Palace Square downtown near the Kazan Kremlin, at various theatres and performance venues in the Kremlin, and at other places throughout the city.

Venues

A total of 27 new stadia were built as venues for the event. The Games used 64 venues in all, 36 of which were constructed specifically for the 2013 Summer Universiade. The 64 venues were concentrated in 4 zones across the city of Kazan. These included the area of Pobeda Avenue with the Kazan Area, the Aquatics Palace of Water Sports, the Combat Sports (Boxing) Palace, and the area of Orenburgsky Trakt where the Universiade Village was located, as well as the Tennis Academy and Gymnastics Palace. In addition, many sports venues for training functions were located elsewhere in Zarechye (Novo-Savinovsky and Airbuilders districts), and some of them in downtown Kazan.

The main venues were:
 Kazan Arena (45,000 seats) — opening/closing ceremonies
 The Central Stadium (26,920 seats) — football, athletics
 TatNeft Arena (10,000 seats) – sambo, judo
 Basket-Hall Arena (7,500 seats) — basketball
 Tennis Academy (7,200 seats) — tennis, badminton
 Saint Petersburg Volleyball Center (4,570 seats) — volleyball
 Aquatics Palace (4,200 seats) — swimming, diving, synchronized swimming
 Gymnastics Palace (3,200 seats) – rhythmic gymnastics, artistic gymnastics
 Ak Bars Combat Sports Center (2,000 seats) – boxing, wrestling, other combat events
 Rowing Center (3,000 seats) – canoe racing, rowing

Universiade Village

The Universiade Village is a residential neighborhood for 14,500 residents that was constructed within the Kazan Federal University campus to house competitors and officials during the Kazan 2013 Summer Universiade.
Nearly 400 sporting and cultural events have been staged on the campus since it opened its doors in 2010. Shortly after the first move-in phase, an open-air step aerobics marathon was held that brought together up to 1,000 Universiade Village residents. The campus had already hosted football, volleyball, and chess championships that can rightfully be called ‘international’ as a number of international students competed in them.

Torch relay
The length of the relay was about 104,000 kilometers, and 2,013 torchbearers were enlisted to participate in the relay. After touring through 51 cities on five continents, the torch arrived in Vladivostok on 24 January, and on 25 January, the Russian leg of the Universiade torch relay began. The Russian section of the Universiade Torch Relay was held between January and July 2013. The Universiade Torch Relay celebrations took place in 30 cities across Russia, as well as 44 cities and towns of municipal districts of Tatarstan. The torch arrived at the Kazan Arena on the night of 6 July for the lighting of the cauldron at the Opening Ceremony.

Medals

A total of 351 sets of medals were distributed during the two weeks of the competition. The medal design featured a globe emblazoned with the emblem and logo of the Universiade, and surrounded by a circle featuring the slogan of the Universiade.

Opening and closing ceremonies

The 2013 Summer Universiade opening and closing ceremonies were held on 6 and 17 July 2013, with Russian President Vladimir Putin and Premier Dmitry Medvedev in attendance accordingly. The ceremonies took place in the new Kazan Arena stadium with a seating capacity of 45,000 people.

Notable songs performed during the opening ceremony, composed by Igor Krutoy include;

 White Bird - Aida Garifullina
The Cradle - Yana Melikaeva
Reflection (Also known as; Ti amo cosi) - Albina Shagimuratova, Ildar Abdrazakov
Memory (Also known as; Credo) - Ekaterina Scherbachenko
The Path (Also known as; La via) - Dmitri Hvorostovsky
Towards (Also known as; Forse non fu) - Alexander Gradsky, Maria Maksakova Jr.

In the handover segment of the closing ceremony, the Korean branch of the boy group EXO performed their hit song "Wolf", the title track from their first full-length album XOXO, at the closing ceremony while Russian artists as Serebro and Zemfira made a huge shows.

Sports

For the first time in the history of the Universiades, twenty-seven sports were included in Kazan 2013.

The optional sports chosen were badminton, beach volleyball, belt wrestling, boxing, canoeing, chess, field hockey, rugby sevens, sambo, shooting, synchronized swimming, rowing, weightlifting, and wrestling. Of the optional sports chosen, belt wrestling, boxing, sambo, rugby sevens, and synchronized swimming made their debut at the 2013 Summer Universiade.

 Aquatics
 
 
 
 
 
 
 
 
 
 
 
 
 
 
 
 
 Artistic gymnastics (14)
 Rhythmic gymnastics (8)

Participants
A total of 162 nations were officially entered prior to the opening ceremony. In the list below, the number of athletes from each nation is given in parentheses. The largest national teams were from Russia, Ukraine, Canada, the U.S., Poland, Japan and China.

 
 
 
 
 
 
 
 
 
 
 
 
 
 
 
 
 
 
 
 
 
 
 
 
 
 
 
 
 
 
 
 
 
 
 
 
 
 
 
 
 
 
 
 
 
 
 
 
 
 
 
 
 
 
 
 
 
 
 
 
 
 
 
 
 
 
  (34)
 
 
 
 
 
 
 
 
 
 
 
 
 
 
 
 
 
 
 
 
 
 
 
 
 
 
 
 
 
 
 
 
 
 
 
 
 
 
 
 
 
 
 
 
 
 
 
 
 
 
 
 
 
 
  (host)

Medal table
From the official website's medal tally information:

In April 2014, Roxana Bârcă from Romania, started a two-year doping ban for the use of Methasterone, and lost the gold medal at the Women's 5000 metres. The ban lasted from 11 July 2013 to 3 September 2015.

On 8 August 2016, the International Weightlifting Federation announced the disqualification of several athletes who participated in the competition due to the retesting of the anti-doping exams, with which several medals are redistributed.

On 18 May 2017, the rankings of the Women's Heptathlon and 1,500m were updated further to the suspension of two Russian female athletes by the Court of Arbitration for Sport (CAS) and the medal table was updated.

On 13 November 2020, the rankings of the Women’s 3000m steeplechase were updated further due to the suspension of two Russians, one Ukrainian and one Turkish female athletes by the Court of Arbitration for Sport (CAS).

On 12 August 2022, the results of Russian Irina Tarasova between July 2012 and July 2016 were annulled by the Athletics Integrity Unit for doping violations. This means that her gold medal in the women's shot put has been stripped.

Record (*)
Russia got almost half of gold medals and more than a quarter of all medals. This is more than any other nation in this games and in the history of Universiades. The media explained this by the fact that the Russian team featured nineteen reigning Olympic champions, who were all listed as students, more than all other teams taken together, in an apparent attempt to make a good impression in Russian language media. There were 67 Universiade records, 38 of them set by Russian athletes.

On 19 July 2013, Vladimir Putin congratulated Russian athletes, and responded to criticism by saying that all critics of Russia's [calling it USSR] achievements should take Viagra.

Schedule

The competition schedule for the 2013 Summer Universiade is shown as follows:

Marketing

Logo, emblem and mascot

Every Universiade logo must contain the Latin letter "U", designating a sporting event held under the auspices of the International University Sports Federation (FISU). The logo of the 2013 Summer Universiade represents a vertical rectangular design that comprises the words "Universiade", "Kazan", "Russia", "2013" and the five stars of the International University Sports Federation (FISU).

The emblem of the 2013 Summer Universiade takes its origin from an image of a tulip, a common element of Tatar ornaments that symbolizes revival.

Uni, a kitten rendering of the symbolic winged snow leopard, was chosen as the mascot for the Kazan 2013 Summer Universiade. The winged snow leopard is the national symbol of the Republic of Tatarstan. A stylized version of this creature is represented on Tatarstan's coat of arms.

Slogan
Each Universiade host city chooses a slogan for their edition of the Games, according to their ideals and goals, and as approved by FISU. The slogan of the Kazan 2013 Summer Universiade was ‘U are the world’, which has two meanings: ‘You are the world’ and ‘Universiade is the World’.

Partners
The League of Partners was founded in November 2010 to ensure a multilateral partnership between business circles and the Kazan 2013 Organizing Committee. The League includes the companies that signed partnership agreements with the Executive Committee of the 27th World University Summer Games. The main mission of the League of Partners is to enlist the support of corporations through a partnership contract with the Kazan 2013 Executive Committee, and also to consolidate all efforts under the unified vision of the Universiade. To achieve that, the partner companies were to implement joint projects aimed at further developing specialized industries that will be part of the Kazan 2013 legacy.
 General partners: Hyundai, MegaFon, local AK BARS Bank
 Official partners: Coca-Cola, McDonald's, Sogaz, Aeroflot, Tissot
 Partners: PWC, English First, Panasonic
 Official suppliers: Danone, Ecolab, Forward, Planet Fitness, ROSTEK-TRANS Logistika, Kaspersky Lab, Technogym, MadWave, Sportmaster Group, Wilson

Tickets
Tickets price ran between 700 and 6000 Russian rubles for the opening and closing ceremonies, and 30 to 200 RR for sporting events. Tickets began to be sold on the Internet one year before the Universiade.

Media support

Some 1,200 journalists from 170 countries were assisted by the Main Press Center (MPC), the International Broadcasting Center (IBC) at Kazan Arena, and the International Info Center at Universiade Village.

The games were televised by Eurosport as well as by 12 other international and 3 Russian TV networks.

Legacy
After the Universiade, the venues and stadia were to be consigned over to high schools and universities of Kazan, to children and youth sport schools, and to Olympic reserve schools. The Universiade Village was to be integrated into the main campus of the Federal University system.

Coins

The Central Bank of Russia issued commemorative coins dedicated to the 27th Summer Universiade Kazan 2013, including silver 3-ruble and 25-ruble, and gold 50-ruble, coins along with 10,000 ruble coins soon to appear in the banks of Russia. The Bank also planned to put into circulation two kinds of 10-ruble base-metal coins to mark the Universiade. These commemorative coins are accepted without limitation for all types of payment as legal tender in the Russian Federation.

References

External links

 Official Games site
 Kazan page on FISU web site

 
U
Universiade Summer
Summer Universiade, 2013
Summer Universiade
Summer World University Games
Multi-sport events in Russia
Articles containing video clips
July 2013 sports events in Russia
21st century in Kazan